Opsariichthys bea is a species of cyprinid fish. It is endemic to Vietnam and only known from its type locality in the Lam River Basin.

References

bea
Cyprinid fish of Asia
Fish of Vietnam
Endemic fauna of Vietnam
Taxa named by Nguyen Thia Tu
Fish described in 1987